4-Iodobenzoic acid,  or p-iodobenzoic acid, is an organic compound with the formula IC6H4COOH.

Structure

X-ray crystallography of 4-iodobenzoic acid has shown that it crystallizes in the solid state as hydrogen-bonded dimers which stack perpendicular to their aromatic rings. The iodine atoms of adjacent dimers are also oriented towards each other due to van der Waals forces.

Preparation
4-Iodobenzoic acid may be prepared in the laboratory by the oxidation of p-iodotoluene with potassium permanganate.

Reactions
The carboxylic acid functionality of 4-iodobenzoic acid undergoes Fischer–Speier esterification with methanol to form the ester methyl 4-iodobenzoate.

See also
2-Iodobenzoic acid

References

Benzoic acids
Iodoarenes